The European Academy of Allergy and Clinical Immunology (EAACI) is a non-profit organisation for European clinicians, researchers and allied health professionals in the field of allergy and clinical immunology, covering asthma, rhinitis, eczema and occupational allergy, food and drug allergy, severe anaphylactic reactions, autoimmune disorders, and immunodeficiencies.

More than 50 national allergy societies are members, representing more than 13,000 people from 121 countries.

History
EAACI was founded in 1956 in Florence, Italy; the following year, its constitution and by-laws were codified in Utrecht, The Netherlands.

Conferences and training courses
The EAACI organises a five-day annual congress, usually attended by around 7000–8000 international participants. The 2022 congress was held in Prague, Czech Republic. The association also organises smaller three-day meetings addressing specific areas in the field of allergy, which are usually attended by 250–1500 participants.The association offers training courses on specific topics.

Affiliations

Sponsors 
EAACI is sponsored by pharmaceutical and medical technology companies including AstraZeneca, DBV Technologies, GlaxoSmithKline, HAL Allergy Group, Novartis, Regeneron Pharmaceuticals, Sanofi, Stallergenes Greer, and Thermo Fisher Scientific.

Partnerships 
EAACI is member of the Alliance for Biomedical Research in Europe (BioMed Alliance), European Chronic Disease Alliance (ECDA), and became involved in the activities of the European Medicines Agency in April 2014.

Publications and resources 
The EAACI publishes three peer-reviewed academic journals:
 Allergy
 Pediatric Allergy and Clinical Immunology
 Clinical and Translational Allergy, an open-access online journal

It also publishes other resources including guidelines and books.

References

External links 
 

Allergy organizations
Organisations based in Zürich
European medical and health organizations